Quéven is a commune in the Morbihan department of Brittany in north-western France.

History 

During World War I, Quéven lost one hundred and one of its children.

85% of the town was destroyed in World War II. In January 1945, the city of Toulouse adopted the ruined town, via its mayor Raymond Badiou. In memory of this help the main square of Quéven was renamed "Place de la ville de Toulouse" and a street in Toulouse was renamed "Rue de Quéven".

The city of Queven has been honoured 25 September 1949 with Cross of War 1929-1945 by the citation 11 November 1948 of the Ministry of the Armed Force, Max Lejeune.

Population
Inhabitants of Quéven are called in French Quévenois.

Twin towns
Quéven is twinned with:
Dunmanway (Ireland)
Koro (Mali)
Altenkunstadt
Weismain in Bavaria (Germany)

Breton language
The municipality launched a linguistic plan through Ya d'ar brezhoneg on 26 September 2008.

In 2008, there was 1,83% of the children attended the bilingual schools in primary education.

See also
Communes of the Morbihan department
Entry on sculptor of Quéven war memorial Jean Joncourt

References

External links

Official website 

 Mayors of Morbihan Association 

Communes of Morbihan